Hoca Sadeddin Efendi (1536/1537 – October 2, 1599) was an Ottoman Islamic scholar, theologian, official, and historian, a teacher of the future Ottoman sultan Murad III. His name may be transcribed variously, e.g. Sa'd ad-Din, Sa'd al-Din, Sa'düddin, or others. He was also called by the title of "Câmi'-ür Riyâseteyn".

When Murad became Sultan, Sadeddin became his advisor. Later he fell out of favor, but was appointed Shaykh al-Islām, a superior authority in the issues of Islam.

Sadeddin is the author of Tâc üt-Tevârîh (Tadj ut-Tewarikh, “Crown of Histories”), a history of the Ottoman Empire in prose and verse.

He had at least five sons: Mehmed Efendi (died 1615), Esad Efendi (died 1625), Mesud Efendi (died 1597), Abdülaziz Efendi (died 1618), and Salih Efendi.

Publications
Hoca Sadeddin Efendi, Tâcü't-tevârih. Sad. İsmet Parmaksızoğlu, vols. 1-5, Kültür Bakanlığı, Ankara, 1974-1979 reprint:1999. ("Sad". means Sadelestiren, "simplification")
Vol. 1: Osman Gazi, Orhan Gazi, Hüdevendigar Gazi ve Yıldırım Han Devirleri.
Vol. 2: Yıldırım Han'dan Fatih Sultan Mehmed'e.
Vol. 3: Fatih Sultan Mehmed ve İkinci Beyazid Dönemi.
Vol. 4: Şehzadelerin Girişimleri - Selimname ve Yavuz Sultan Selim Dönemi.
Vol. 5: Hatime. Orijinal karton kapaklarında.
Saad ed-dini scriptoris turcici Annales turcici usque ad Muradem I cum textu turcico impressi. Translated to Latin, edited and annotated by Adam F. Kollár. Vienna: 1755.
Bulgarian translation: Калицин, Мария. Корона на историите на Ходжа Садеддин. Transl. of Vol. 1. from Osman Turkish; analysis and commentary. Велико Търново (Veliko Tarnovo), Publ. "Абагар" ("Abagar"), 2000, 437 с,

Sources 

1536 births
1599 deaths
Political people from the Ottoman Empire
Sheikh-ul-Islams of the Ottoman Empire
16th-century historians from the Ottoman Empire
Islamic scholars from the Ottoman Empire
Shaykh al-Islāms